Romainville is a commune in the Seine-Saint-Denis department and in the eastern suburbs of Paris, France.

Location

History
On 24 July 1867, a part of the territory of Romainville was detached and merged with a part of the territory of Pantin and a part of the territory of Bagnolet to create the commune of Les Lilas.

Heraldry

Population

Transport
Romainville is served by no station of the Paris Métro, RER, or suburban rail network. The closest stations to Romainville are Mairie des Lilas station on Paris Métro Line 11 and Bobigny - Pantin - Raymond Queneau station on Paris Métro Line 5. The former is located in the neighboring commune of Les Lilas,  from the town center of Romainville, and the latter is located in the neighboring commune of Pantin,  from the town center of Romainville.

There are plans to extend Paris Métro Line 11 beyond its terminus at Mairie des Lilas station, reaching the town center of Romainville and beyond to Rosny-sous-Bois. In 2022, a station on place Carnot will be opened with a connection to tram line 1.

Education
 there were 1,147 preschool (maternelle) students and 1,637 elementary students in Romainville communal primary schools, making a total of 2,782 students.

Primary schools:
 Preschools: Marcel Cachin, Danielle Casanova, Charlie Chaplin, Jean Charcot, Youri Gagarine, Véronique et Florestan
 Elementary schools: Henri Barbusse, Marcel Cachin, Jean Charcot, Fraternité, Paul Langevin, Gabriel-Péri, Paul Vaillant-Couturier, Maryse-Bastié.

Junior high schools:
 Collège Gustave Courbet
 Collège Pierre-André Houël

Lycée Liberté, a vocational high school, is in Romainville.

International relations

Romainville is twinned with:
 Pápa, Hungary
 Benfleet, England since 1962

See also
 Tour Hertzienne TDF de Romainville
Communes of the Seine-Saint-Denis department
Convoi des 31000

References

External links
Official website (in French)

Communes of Seine-Saint-Denis